e² is a greatest hits album by the Italian singer Eros Ramazzotti, released in Europe and Latin America on 26 October 2007. This is his fourteenth album (including live and compilation albums), and his second greatest hits album after Eros in 1997. The first single released from the album was "Non siamo soli", a vocal duet with the Latin singer Ricky Martin.

Track listing

Disc 1
The first disc has four new songs and fourteen remastered hits.

Disc 2
The second disc has seventeen hits "revised" with popular international artists.

DVD (limited edition only)
A limited edition DVD was released in Italy, with an additional DVD with fourteen music videos.

Charts

Weekly charts

Year-end charts

Certifications

References

Eros Ramazzotti compilation albums
Albums produced by John Shanks
2007 greatest hits albums
Sony BMG Norte compilation albums
Music video compilation albums
2007 video albums
Italian-language compilation albums
Spanish-language compilation albums
Albums produced by Michele Canova